is located in the northern part of Nagasaki, Japan. Participation in the degree-seeking programs is open to students from around the world. A level of Japanese language ability is necessary.
The university also organizes two short-term programs for students who are in Japan as study abroad students: the Japan Studies in Nagasaki (JASIN) Program and the Nagasaki International Communications Studies (NICS) Program.  The JASIN Program is designed for students from Western countries so that the application, orientation, counseling and Japan Studies classes are conducted in English.  The NICS Program is designed for students from Asia so that the above services are conducted in Japanese.  Both Programs require Japanese language study. Students are placed in an appropriate level of Japanese language study (Beginning to Advanced) according to a placement test. No previous Japanese language study is required of JASIN students, but NICS students are required to begin from an intermediate level of Japanese.
It was founded in December 1945, based upon the ideals of the YMCA. Its motto is to promote peace through international communication and understanding.

This university is located in a very historic city, and provides not only classes for Japanese students but international students (ryuugakusei) as well.

External links
 Official site
 Study abroad page from SUNY New Paltz gives some background on the university 

Educational institutions established in 2001
Christian universities and colleges in Japan
Private universities and colleges in Japan
Buildings and structures in Nagasaki
Universities and colleges in Nagasaki Prefecture
Japanese junior colleges
2001 establishments in Japan